Sing You Home (2011) is the nineteenth novel by the American author, Jodi Picoult. The novel was released on March 1, 2011, and follows the story of a bisexual woman fighting for the right to use the frozen embryos created by her and her ex-husband. The novel features a companion soundtrack CD of ten original songs with lyrics written by Picoult, and music by her best friend, Ellen Wilber. Wilber also performs the songs on the CD in the voice of the story's main character, Zoe Baxter.

Plot
Zoe Baxter, a music therapist, and her husband, Max Baxter, have tried for a decade to have children, but it is revealed that they cannot have children because of fertility issues. Zoe has experienced multiple miscarriages, and she eventually learns that she suffers from polycystic ovary syndrome. On the other hand, Max learns that he has a genetic disease. Over the course of their marriage, they have tried five rounds of in vitro fertilization. After two miscarries, Zoe successfully becomes pregnant, but loses the baby in late pregnancy, during her baby shower no less, much to her great sorrow. Zoe and Max soon divorce because Max doesn't want Zoe to pressure him into trying again for a child. 

Sometime later, Zoe, has not recovered from the loss of another baby and the shock of the divorce. Max has since moved in with his brother, Reid, and his sister-in-law, Liddy. Reid and Liddy are devout Christians, who are also trying to have children, and have similarly experienced several miscarriages because of the Baxter family infertility issue. At the beginning, Max is hostile to Reid, Liddy, and their pastor's efforts to convert him to their religion, Evangelicalism, but he eventually warms up to the church and becomes a born-again Christian. 

While floating at the bottom of a pool early in the morning, Zoe meets Vanessa Shaw, an openly gay woman. Vanessa thinking that Zoe is drowning saves her, but Zoe tells her she was only floating at the bottom of the pool, looking up at the lights. Zoe and Vanessa quickly become friends and eventually fall in love. At first Zoe is unwilling to admit the relationship with Vanessa, but when Vanessa is saddened that Zoe is ashamed of her, Zoe admits to her ex-husband, Max, when she has a chance meeting with him at a grocery store, that she and Vanessa are dating. Max is shocked and disgusted, and confides to Pastor Clive that he fears Zoe "turned" to lesbianism because he was not enough of a man to satisfy her.

Soon after the incident, Zoe and Vanessa marry. Zoe still wants to have a child, but requires a hysterectomy after the discovery of endometrial cancer. Vanessa suggests that she could carry one of Zoe's frozen embryos, and Zoe readily agrees. Zoe and Vanessa learn that since the embryos are Max's too, Max must agree for Zoe and Vanessa to use the embryos. Zoe asks Max if he will agree to the use of the embryos, and Max tells her he will think about it. Zoe and Vanessa, thinking that Max is surely going to agree, begin thinking of names and furnishing the baby's room. Meanwhile, Zoe is working with a rebellious teenage girl named Lucy, who is hostile and angry.

Max consults Pastor Clive, who tells him that no child should be subjected to being raised in a same-sex household. Pastor Clive urges Max to sue Zoe and Vanessa for the parental rights to raise the embryos, which he refers to as "pre-born children", and that Max should allow the child to be raised by Reid and Liddy, who cannot conceive children. Stunningly, Max agrees, and sues Zoe and Vanessa.

Zoe is incredulous that Max would betray her like that. The two hire their own lawyer, Angela Moretti, who specializes in gay and lesbian cases. In turn, Max and Pastor Clive enlist legal help from Wade Preston, a Christian lawyer, and Ben Benjamin.

Over the course of the trial gears shift several times. Initially the judge seems to side with Zoe and Vanessa, but then evidence is supplied that Lucy—who is, in fact, Pastor Clive's stepdaughter—was molested by Zoe, which is an untrue allegation. Nevertheless, Zoe is distraught and agrees to allow Max to have parental rights over the embryos.  

Max eventually realizes that he is in love with Liddy, and that to sit by and watch the child be raised as Reid and Liddy's child, with the lesser role of uncle, could be unbearable. Max changes his mind and gives the embryos to Zoe and Vanessa to raise as their own. Zoe and Vanessa allow Max to play the role of father.

The epilogue is set seven years in the future, through the eyes of Samantha "Sammy" Baxter. Sammy is six years old, has a dog named Ollie, and calls her mothers "Mama Ness" and "Mommy Zoe". Sammy defends her mothers against bullying remarks made by her classmates. She reveals that Liddy and Max are together and plan on getting married. In the end Sammy relays that she is a very happy child, and is, really, the luckiest little girl in the world.

Characters 
Zoe Baxter: A music therapist for burn victims, individuals with Alzheimer's disease, and hospice patients. Previously married to Max, and then Vanessa. Samantha's mother. 

Max Baxter: Zoe's ex-husband, a spiralling alcoholic who is eventually saved by the local Evangelical church, and Pastor Clive. Samatha's biological father. 

Vanessa Shaw: An openly-gay guidance counselor, Zoe's lover, eventual wife, and Samantha's mother. 

Clive Lincoln: A overzealous and charismatic Evangelical Christian pastor, deeply opposed to gay marriage and LGBTQ rights. 

Lucy: Pastor Clive's step-daughter, and an adolescent that Zoe is helping with music therapy, she falsely accuses Zoe of molesting her. 

Angela Moretti: Zoe and Vanessa's lawyer, who specializes in gay and lesbian legal cases. 

Wade Preston: A Christian lawyer, hired by Pastor Clive for Max's lawsuit against Zoe and Vanessa. 

Samantha "Sammy" Baxter: Zoe and Vanessa's young daughter, also Max's biological daughter. 

Ollie: Sammy's dog.

Narrative style 
Sing You Home is told from multiple alternating character perspectives. This narrative style entails characters taking turns to narrate the events in their lives from differing perspectives. Each chapter is told through the perspective of either Zoe, Max, Vanessa, and Samatha, and each character's narrative is told in a different font. Picoult often employs this writing technique, including in, Songs of the Humpback Whale, My Sister's Keeper, Change of Heart, and House Rules.

Film adaptation 
Ellen DeGeneres acquired the rights to the book in order to turn it into a film. DeGeneres will be producing the film along with Craig Zaden and Neil Meron.

References

Novels by Jodi Picoult
2011 American novels
Novels with gay themes
Atria Publishing Group books